Daniel Edward Reeves (January 19, 1944 – January 1, 2022) was an American football running back and coach in the National Football League (NFL). During his 38 years in the NFL, Reeves participated in nine Super Bowls, the third most for an individual. He was a head coach for 23 seasons, a position he held with the Denver Broncos from 1981 to 1992, the New York Giants from 1993 to 1996, and the Atlanta Falcons from 1997 to 2003. As a player, he spent his eight-season career with the Dallas Cowboys, who signed him as an undrafted free agent in 1965.

Reeves made his first two Super Bowl appearances during his playing career, winning one in Super Bowl VI. He began his coaching career in 1972 as an assistant for Cowboys, where he made three championship appearances and was part of the staff that won Super Bowl XII. As the head coach of the Broncos for twelve seasons, Reeves led the team to three championship appearances in Super Bowl XXI, Super Bowl XXII, and Super Bowl XXIV, each of which ended in defeat. Following four seasons as the head coach of the Giants, Reeves served as the Falcons' head coach for seven seasons. His most successful season with the Falcons was when he led the franchise to their championship debut in Super Bowl XXXIII, in which he was defeated by his former team, the Broncos. For his accomplishments in Denver, Reeves was inducted to the Broncos Ring of Fame in 2014.

One of only nine NFL head coaches to win 200 career games, Reeves has the most playoff wins (eleven, tied with Marv Levy) and Super Bowl appearances (four, tied with Levy and Bud Grant) among NFL head coaches to not win a championship. He is also tied with Jeff Fisher for the most regular season losses in the NFL at 165, although Reeves has a higher winning percentage. Reeves and Marty Schottenheimer are the only eligible NFL head coaches with 200 career wins that have not been inducted into the Pro Football Hall of Fame.

Early years
Born in Rome, Georgia, Reeves grew up in Americus, Georgia. He attended Americus High School, where he participated in football, baseball, and basketball.

After Reeves missed four games with a broken collarbone during his senior season, only the University of South Carolina was interested enough to offer him a football scholarship. The interest from other schools came later, when he won the MVP trophy at the Georgia High School football All-star game, but he decided to stay with his first choice. Reeves also was selected to the All-state basketball team in 1961.

College career
Reeves played college football for the South Carolina Gamecocks, where he was a three-year starter at quarterback from 1962 to 1964. Reeves became the starting quarterback during his sophomore year in 1962 and was named second-team All-conference after his junior and senior years.

Even though he only compiled an 8–21–4 record, Reeves ended his college career as the leading passer in Gamecock history, accumulating 2,561 yards passing, to go along with sixteen touchdowns and three games with 100 rushing yards. Reeves also played for the South Carolina Gamecocks baseball team.

In 1977, Reeves was inducted into the school's Athletic Hall of Fame. In 2006, he was inducted into the State of South Carolina Athletic Hall of Fame.

Professional playing career
Although he went undrafted after graduation, Reeves received professional sports offers from the Dallas Cowboys in the National Football League (NFL), the San Diego Chargers in the American Football League (AFL) and the Pittsburgh Pirates in Major League Baseball. Reeves signed with the Cowboys as an undrafted free agent in 1965 to play safety, but was later moved to halfback when a series of injuries depleted the team's depth during training camp.

In 1966, Tom Landry, looking for more speed at running back, shifted All-Pro safety Mel Renfro to offense. Renfro was hurt in the opening game, against the New York Giants, and Reeves took advantage of his opportunity by having a breakout season, leading the team in rushing with 757 yards and scoring with 96 points, while finishing second in receiving with 557 yards. His performance helped the Cowboys take some of the running load from fullback Don Perkins and reach their first championship game. Reeves set a franchise record with sixteen touchdowns (eight rushing and eight receiving), had over 1,300 all-purpose yards, was sixth in the NFL in rushing, first in touchdowns, and sixth in scoring. He was also voted to The Sporting News All-Pro team at the end of the year.

In 1967, Reeves posted back-to-back seasons with more than 600 rushing yards, ranking second on the team in rushing with 603 yards and third in receiving with 490 yards. In the week 8 game against the Atlanta Falcons, he set a franchise record after scoring four touchdowns. In the week 13 game against the Philadelphia Eagles, Reeves scored touchdowns rushing, receiving, and passing in the same game. He remained a starter until Week 4 of the 1968 season, when he tore ligaments in his left knee and was lost for the season.

The injury ended up hampering Reeves for the remainder of his career and limiting his abilities. Head coach Tom Landry started playing him in spots and asked him to become a player-coach, while being passed on the depth chart by Calvin Hill and Duane Thomas. Reeves remained in that role for three years, until he retired as an active player to become a full-time assistant coach on February 22, 1972.

Reeves played eight seasons with the Dallas Cowboys, collected 1,990 rushing yards, 1,693 receiving yards, and 42 touchdowns. The Cowboys made the playoffs every year, reaching the Super Bowl twice and culminating in a 24–3 victory over the Miami Dolphins in Super Bowl VI following the 1971 season. In Super Bowl V with the Cowboys and Colts tied at 13 in the last two minutes, he let a pass go through his hands that was intercepted, setting up the Colts in Dallas territory. The Colts won the game on a 32-yard field goal from Jim O'Brien with five seconds left. He threw a touchdown pass in the Cowboys' losing effort in the legendary subzero Ice Bowl against the Green Bay Packers for the 1967 NFL title.

In 2010, Reeves was inducted into the Texas Sports Hall of Fame.

Coaching career
Reeves, a protégé of Tom Landry, became the youngest head coach in the NFL when he joined the Denver Broncos in 1981 as vice president and head coach. After acquiring quarterback John Elway in a trade, Reeves guided the Broncos to six post-season appearances, five divisional titles, three AFC championships, and three Super Bowl appearances (Super Bowl XXI, Super Bowl XXII, and Super Bowl XXIV) during his twelve year tenure. He was the only AFC coach in the decade of the 1980s to lead his team to consecutive Super Bowl berths, and  his Broncos appeared in the Super Bowl three times during a span of four years. Reeves and Elway did not always see eye-to-eye, to the point where quarterback Tommy Maddox was drafted by the Broncos in the first round of the 1992 draft. This came off the heels of the 1991 season in which Reeves had fired offensive coordinator and quarterbacks coach Mike Shanahan for "insubordination", as Reeves felt that Shanahan was driving a wedge between him and Elway, who said in 1990 that his relationship with the head coach was "the worst." Reeves was fired after the season and replaced by his protégé and friend Wade Phillips, who was previously the Broncos' defensive coordinator. Upon the death of Reeves in 2022, Elway stated that Reeves was a "winner" and said he owed a good deal of his career to Reeves.

Reeves was hired as head coach by the New York Giants for the 1993 season. In his first season, he led the Giants to an 11–5 record and a berth in the playoffs. Reeves's 1993 season record is the best ever for a first-year Giants coach, and he was named the 1993 Associated Press Coach of the Year after helping them improve from a 6–10 record in 1992. Reeves was fired after the Giants went 5–11 in 1995 and 6–10 in 1996.

In 1997, Reeves was named the head coach of the Atlanta Falcons. Under his command the team, which had finished the 1996 campaign with a 3–13 record, steadily improved. After going 7–9 in his first season, the Falcons went 14–2 in 1998, going on to capture their first NFC championship. He became the third coach (after Bill Parcells and Chuck Knox) to lead three different franchises to the playoffs. Reeves coached the Falcons to a 12–2 record before being hospitalized for the final two regular season games to undergo quadruple-bypass heart surgery in December. Reeves managed to return to the sidelines just three weeks later to lead the Falcons to victory in their first NFC Championship. During Super Bowl XXXIII, Reeves's Falcons were pitched against his former team, the defending champion Denver Broncos whose quarterback Elway was in his final season that had Shanahan as head coach. The Falcons lost, 34–19. In the process, Reeves earned the NFL's top coaching awards as he was named the 1998 NFL Coach of the Year. In 2003, after winning just three of the first thirteen games, Reeves asked to be released and the Falcons replaced him with Wade Phillips as interim coach for three games.

In 2007, Reeves had an active role in the startup of Georgia State University's football program. In January 2009, Reeves interviewed with the San Francisco 49ers for their offensive coordinator job. After negotiations with the Dallas Cowboys, Reeves became a consultant for the team in February 2009. This role was short-lived, lasting two days before Reeves turned in the keys to his office and left. Reeves and the Cowboys could apparently not reach conclusions as to Reeves's role with the team. In the days following, it was revealed that the dispute came down to a contract clause specifying a number of hours per week to be worked, which Reeves deemed insulting.

Head coaching record

Broadcast career
Reeves covered NFL games as a color analyst (teamed with play-by-play man Bill Rosinski) for the second Sunday afternoon game on the Westwood One radio network.

Personal life and death
Reeves was married to Pam Reeves, and had three children and six grandchildren. Reeves and his future wife dated in high school, where she was a cheerleader. While coaching for the Giants, Reeves and his wife were residents of Ho-Ho-Kus, New Jersey. He was a Christian.

Reeves' nephew is David Andrews, who plays in the NFL. His son-in-law, Joe DeCamillis, is a longtime NFL assistant.

Reeves died from complications of dementia at his home in Atlanta on the morning of January 1, 2022, aged 77.

See also

 List of professional gridiron football coaches with 200 wins

Books

References

External links
 
 
 Sports Reference – collegiate statistics – Dan Reeves
 Pro-Football-Reference coach page

1944 births
2022 deaths
20th-century American male writers
20th-century American non-fiction writers
American autobiographers
American football quarterbacks
American football running backs
Atlanta Falcons head coaches
College football announcers
Dallas Cowboys coaches
Dallas Cowboys players
Denver Broncos head coaches
National Football League announcers
Deaths from dementia in Georgia (U.S. state)
New York Giants head coaches
People from Americus, Georgia
People from Ho-Ho-Kus, New Jersey
Players of American football from Georgia (U.S. state)
South Carolina Gamecocks football players
Sportspeople from Rome, Georgia